The Rose Hill Historic District is a nationally recognized historic district located in Sioux City, Iowa, United States. It was listed on the National Register of Historic Places in 2002.  At the time of its nomination it contained 217 resources, which included 132 contributing buildings 84 non-contributing buildings, and one non-contributing site.  The district is located within the larger Rose Hill Addition, which was laid out by a group of Sioux City entrepreneurs in 1884.  It includes many mansions built for the wealthy from about 1890 to 1910, most of which were later divided into apartments.  The Elzy G. Burkam House (1894) and adjacent garage are contributing properties.  It also included a 125-year-old house at 1529 Grandview Boulevard which was demolished in 2015 after a long controversy about historic preservation.

References

External links
Government
 Sioux City Urban Renewal Area

National Register of Historic Places in Sioux City, Iowa
Queen Anne architecture in Iowa
Colonial Revival architecture in Iowa
Historic districts on the National Register of Historic Places in Iowa
Historic districts in Sioux City, Iowa